"Astronomia" is a house song by Dutch electronic music duo Vicetone and Russian DJ and record producer Tony Igy, created as a remix of Igy's 2010 song with the same name. It was released on July 9, 2014.

Background
The original Astronomia song was released in Russia in 2010. Vicetone created a remix of the original song in 2014 and sent it to Tony Igy, who liked it. Igy's label did not approve of the remix, so the remix was released for free online.

Reception
In 2020, amidst the COVID-19 Pandemic, the song became the subject of the "Coffin Dance" internet meme, which involves the remix playing over a group of Ghanaian men dancing while carrying a coffin. This was a common funeral tradition in Ghana and parts of Africa with the idea of sending off deceased loved ones in style, rather than in the usual manner of mourning a loss.

Charts

Weekly charts

Year-end charts

Certifications

References

2014 songs
Electronic dance music songs
Internet memes introduced in 2014